Aaron E. Pollock (born February 12, 1967) is an American rower. He competed in the men's coxed pair event at the 1992 Summer Olympics.

References

External links
 

1967 births
Living people
American male rowers
Olympic rowers of the United States
Rowers at the 1992 Summer Olympics
Rowers from San Francisco